Nurul Islam Omar is a Bangladeshi politician and the incumbent Member of Parliament from Bogra-6.

Early life
Omar was born on 13 January 1955. He has a B.A. degree.

Career
Omar was elected to Parliament from Bogra-6 as a Jatiya Party candidate in 2014.

References

Living people
10th Jatiya Sangsad members
1955 births
Jatiya Party politicians